Leylah (also Romanized as Leylāh; also known as Leylā) is a village in Jahangiri Rural District, in the Central District of Masjed Soleyman County, Khuzestan Province, Iran. At the 2006 census, its population was 26, in 5 families.

References 

Populated places in Masjed Soleyman County